The D.C. Lottery (official name District of Columbia Office of Lottery and Gaming) is run by the government of the District of Columbia, in the United States. The D.C. Lottery is a charter member of the Multi-State Lottery Association (MUSL). Games offered include Lucky for Life, Powerball, DC-5, DC-4, DC-3, DC-2, Keno, Mega Millions, and numerous scratch tickets.

The D.C. Lottery began in 1982. In its history, it has given over $2.22 billion to the District of Columbia to help with education, public safety, child services, and other causes.

All D.C. Lottery games have a minimum age of 18.

In 2009, the board proceeds were: 52.19% for prizes; 28.03% to DC's general funds; 8.55% for contracts or other costs; 6.24% agents' commissions; and 4.99% administrative costs.

Charitable games
The board licenses games of chance that are conducted by D.C.-based non-profit organizations. D.C., Virginia, and Maryland-based charities can offer raffles, with the provision that these drawings are held in the District of Columbia. Organizations seeking to conduct such fundraisers must obtain a license from the Board, with D.C. Lottery employees supervising the drawings to assure fairness.

Current draw games

In-house draw games

DC 2
DC 2 is a Pick 2 game, drawn twice daily.

DC 3
DC 3 is a Pick 3 game drawn twice daily.

DC 4
DC 4 is also drawn twice daily.

DC 5
DC 5 is a game drawn twice daily in the style of DC2, DC 3 and DC 4, with straight and box wagers. It is played in the same manner as Pennsylvania's Pick 5, and Ohio's Pick 5.

Race2Riches
Race2Riches is a horse betting type game, drawings are every four minutes, from 6 a.m. to 2 a.m. daily. The rules here, is to bet which horse will win at the 1st, 2nd, and 3rd place.

Multi-state games

Hot Lotto

As of December 24, 2016, Hot Lotto is no longer offered in the District of Columbia.

Lucky for Life

Lucky for Life began in Connecticut in 2009; it expanded in 2015 to include the District of Columbia, and is now offered by 17 jurisdictions.

Mega Millions

On January 31, 2010, most U.S. lotteries with either Mega Millions or Powerball began offering both games. The D.C. Lottery added Mega Millions on the cross-selling expansion date. The largest Mega Millions jackpot was over $650,000,000.

Powerball

Since 1988, the D.C. Lottery has been a member of MUSL, which created Powerball in 1992. Its jackpots currently start at $40 million. It is drawn Wednesday and Saturday nights at Universal Orlando in Florida.

On September 19, 2010, the D.C. Lottery had entered the wrong Powerball numbers into its computer system. Terminals read some losing tickets as winners, and vice versa. The lottery revised its procedures to prevent such errors from recurring.

On January 31, 2010, most lotteries with either Mega Millions or Powerball began offering both games. The D.C. Lottery added Mega Millions on that date. The largest jackpot in Mega Millions so far was more than $640 million.

Sports Wagering

On May 14, 2018 the Supreme Court of the United States ruled that the Professional and Amateur Sports Protection Act of 1992 which allowed sports wagering only in the State of Nevada to be unconstitutional this was brought forth in the case of Christie v. the NCAA in which then New Jersey Governor Chris Christie (R) wanted to legalize sports wagering in his and other states and territories (Including the District) but professional sports organizations including the National Collegiate Athletic Association (NCAA), Major League Baseball, National Football League and the National Hockey League opposed such operations. Following the ruling, the District of Columbia government which included Mayor Muriel Bowser (D) and the members of the D.C. City Council began working on legalizing sports wagering within the District. On September 21, 2021 the D.C. City Council passed, and Mayor Bowser signed into law that legalized sports wagering, the D.C. Lottery was tasked with overseeing the regulation of sports wagering licenses and sportsbook facility.

The D.C. Lottery began operating a wagering app which Geo-fences customers to areas within the District of Columbia but access to certain areas of the District would be excluded including on Capitol Hill including residential areas and in and around all the federal buildings and within 2 blocks of a brick and mortar sportsbook facility. The D.C. lottery also began operating sports wagering kiosks (GamBetDC) at authorized D.C. Lottery agents including at local Bodegas, Bars, Gas stations and Restaurants. William Hill owned by Caesars Entertainment was the first sportsbook in the District of Columbia opening its temporary sportsbook in an unused box office area of the Capital One Arena on July 31, 2020 and its permanent sportsbook on May 26, 2021, in the former Greene Turtle Sports Bar and Restaurant on the F and 6th Streets N.W. corner of the Capital One Arena. This was followed by BetMGM opening a sportsbook at Nationals Park, FanDuel sportsbook at Audi Field and a sportsbook which will open at the Entertainment and Sports Arena.

As part of the regulations of sports wagering, the District of Columbia prohibits the betting on local college sports including athletics at Georgetown University, George Washington University, American University and Howard University. This is consistent with states like New Jersey which also prohibit wagering on collegiate athletics at big universities like Rutgers, Seton Hall and Princeton.

References

External links
D.C. Lottery official website

District
Government in Washington, D.C.
Economy of Washington, D.C.
Computer-drawn lottery games